Barangay elections are elections in the Philippines in the barangays, the smallest of the administrative divisions in the Philippines. Barangays make up cities and municipalities and in turn are made up of sitios and puroks, whose leaders are not elected. Voters of each barangay over 18 years old are eligible to vote for one barangay captain and seven barangay councilors. Together, the barangay captain and barangay councilors make up the Sangguniang Barangay (barangay council). Voters aged 15 to 17 years old vote in elections for the Sangguniang Kabataan (SK): one SK chairperson and seven SK councilors during the same election. The winning SK chairperson serves as a member of the barangay council.

Barangay captains and SK chairmen are elected via first-past-the-post voting system, while barangay and SK councilors are elected via the plurality-at-large voting system with one barangay as an at-large "district".

While candidates are nominally nonpartisan and do not represent political parties, slates consisting of a candidate for a barangay captain and seven barangay councilor candidates are not uncommon; SK slates are also sometimes connected to a slate of a barangay captain. Winning candidates serve for a term of three years, with reelection of up to two more times. Terms of office for barangay officials are usually extended when elections are postponed as a cost-saving measure.

Winning barangay captains in a certain municipality or city elect amongst themselves an Association of Barangay Captains (ABC) president that will serve as their representative in the Sangguniang Bayan (municipal council) or Sangguniang Panlungsod (city council). ABC presidents in a certain province will elect amongst their representative in the Sangguniang Panlalawigan (provincial board). ABC presidents in provincial boards and city councils not under a jurisdiction of a province elect amongst themselves a national president and other officials of the League of Barangays of the Philippines.

SK chairmen undergo a similar series of indirect elections at every level, with the national federation president sitting as a member of the National Youth Commission.

History
In a 1981 referendum, the electorate was asked if barangay elections should be done after the concurrently-held presidential election; the electorate carried the proposal. The Barangay Election Act of 1982 prescribed that the election shall be on May 17, 1982, terms start on June 7, and that terms shall be for six years.

Elections since 1982

Indirect elections

Barangay captain

SK chairperson

See also
 Local government in the Philippines
 List of cities and municipalities in the Philippines

References

External links
Comelec.gov.ph: official Commission on Elections website
Senate.gov.ph: Republic Act No. 9340

 
Barangays of the Philippines